The list of ship launches in 1860 includes a chronological list of some ships launched in 1860.



References 

1860
Ship launches